Atu Rosalina Sagita (born 16 June 1981) is a former Indonesian badminton player, and now lived and playing badminton in England. Rosalina was part of the Indonesia junior team that won the girls' team silver at the 1999 Asian Junior Championships, and also won the bronze medal in the girls' singles event. She won the women's singles title at the 2001 Indonesian National Championships. Rosalina retired from the Indonesia national team in 2003, and moved to Brunei to work as sparing partner for the Royal Family. She then moved to Denmark and played at the Skælskør Badmintonklub in 2005, after that in France for the Chambly. Rosalina married to Agung Mandala, and lived in Colchester, England. As an English player, she was the semi-finalist at the 2016 National Championships, and reaching in to the final round in 2017.

Achievements

Asian Junior Championships 
Girls' singles

BWF International Challenge/Series 
Women's singles

Women's doubles

References

External links 
 

1981 births
Living people
Sportspeople from Bandung
Sportspeople from Colchester
Indonesian female badminton players
French female badminton players
English female badminton players